The 2022 Rugby World Cup Sevens was the eighth edition of the Rugby World Cup Sevens organised by World Rugby.  The 2022 tournament, comprising 24 men's and 16 women's teams as previously, was played over three days in one venue in September. It took place at the Cape Town Stadium in Cape Town, South Africa between 9 and 11 September 2022. It was the first ever Rugby World Cup Sevens in Africa. The dates were chosen to take into account in the Commonwealth Games tournament which took place in July the same year.

Bidding
A record 11 unions formally expressed interest in hosting Rugby World Cup Sevens 2022. The unions were issued formal bid application documents by World Rugby and had to submit their responses by 16 July 2019. South Africa was awarded the rights to host the tournament on 29 October 2019.

 
  Argentina
  Cayman Islands
  France
  Germany
  India
  Jamaica
  Malaysia
  Qatar
  Scotland
  South Africa
  Tunisia

Venue
The tournament took place at the Cape Town Stadium in Cape Town.

The 55,000-capacity stadium was the same venue that hosted the Cape Town Sevens since 2015, and for the first time that year hosted both men's and women's teams across three days of competition as part of the new-look World Rugby Sevens Series.

The 2022 tournament followed a Rugby World Cup Sevens 2018 in San Francisco which attracted a record attendance for a rugby event in the USA of more than 100,000 fans, as well as a huge domestic broadcast audience of more than nine million viewers. The 2018 event, hosted at AT&T Park, generated a US$90.5 million economic contribution to San Francisco (Nielsen Sport) and saw both New Zealand's men's and women's teams retain the title.

Schedule
The tournament was played for 3 days between 9 and 11 September.

Qualifying

Men

The eight quarter-finalists from the 2018 Rugby World Cup Sevens, including the 2022 tournament host South Africa, were automatic qualifiers. The remaining 16 places were decided from the six continental regions.

Women

The four semifinalists from the 2018 Rugby World Cup Sevens were automatic qualifiers, with South Africa also qualifying as host. The remaining eleven places were decided from the six continental regions.

Tournament

Men

Women

Attendance
More than 105,000 spectators attended the three day tournament.

References

External links
 Rugby World Cup Sevens

 
2022
2022 rugby sevens competitions
International rugby union competitions hosted by South Africa
Rugby sevens competitions in South Africa
Sports competitions in Cape Town
2022 in South African sport
Rugby World Cup Sevens